Maianthemum stellatum (star-flowered, starry, or little false Solomon's seal, or simply false Solomon's seal; star-flowered lily-of-the-valley or starry false lily of the valley; syn. Smilacina stellata) is a species of flowering plant, native across North America. It has been found in northern Mexico, every Canadian province and territory except Nunavut, and from every US state except Hawaii and the states of the Southeast. It has little white buds in the spring, followed by delicate starry flowers, then green-and-black striped berries, and finally deep red berries in the fall.

Description
Maianthemum stellatum is a herbaceous perennial plant It grows from extensively branching rhizomes, often forming dense patches. Plants are 2-6 dm tall with 8-11 leaves.

Leaves
Leaves can be variable, but are usually clasping and often blue-green and folded along the mid-rib.

Flowering clusters
Flowers are set in an un-branched cluster (raceme) at the tip of the flowering stem. Racemes are 1.5–5 cm long and 6–15-flowered. Flowers are set at one per node along the flowering stem, on stalks (pedicles) 6–12 mm long.

Flowers and fruits  
Tepals are white and 3–5 mm long. Green berries have distinctive dark stripes, eventually ripening to black.

Distribution
Native across North America generally from Alaska to California to North Carolina to Newfoundland, plus northern Mexico (Sonora, Chihuahua, Coahuila, Nuevo León). It has been found in every Canadian province and territory except Nunavut, and from every US state except Hawaii and the states of the Southeast.

Habitat and ecology
Found in open woods, prairies and shorelines.

Similar species
Maianthemum stellatum is smaller than its close relative M. racemosum. For comparison, M. stellatum has smaller, more open inflorescences that are un-branched and have fewer flowers, flowers with stamens shorter rather than longer than the tepals, and usually somewhat narrower and more curved leaves. Both species show the characteristic zigzag of the stem between the alternate leaves. True Solomon's seal (Polygonatum multiflorum and related species) have a similar overall appearance, but the flowers hang from the stem underneath the leaves, rather than forming a terminal cluster.

Gallery

See also
 Maianthemum racemosum, false Solomon's seal
 Polygonatum biflorum, Solomon's seal

References

stellatum
Flora of North America
Plants described in 1753
Taxa named by Carl Linnaeus
Flora without expected TNC conservation status